Mehmet Cengiz Bozkurt (born 24 December 1964) is a Turkish actor. He is best known for his role as Erdal Bakkal in the hit surreal comedy series Leyla ile Mecnun.

A graduate of Ankara Atatürk Lisesi, in 1984 he enrolled in Middle East Technical University to study physics but changed his major to stage acting in 1990. He then moved to England, where he lived for 14 years. In 1996, he graduated from Goldsmiths, University of London with a degree in "Media and Communication" studies. He then briefly shot documentaries for some channels and directed short movies. He returned to acting with the encouragement of Mehmet Ergen and worked at Arcola Theatre. Upon returning to Turkey, he continued his career by appearing in various movies and TV series.

Filmography

Discography

Awards 
24th Sadri Alışık Theatre and Cinema Awards, "Best Supporting Actor in a Comedy Role" - Ailecek Şaşkınız (2019)
47th International Antalya Golden Orange Film Festival, "Best Supporting Actor" - Kavşak (2010)

References

External links 
 
 

1965 births
Turkish male television actors
Turkish male film actors
Turkish male stage actors
Living people
People from Nevşehir